Aleppo Public Park (Arabic: الحديقة العامة بحلب) is a 17 hectare urban park located in Aleppo, Syria. With its hexagonal shape the park is located in Gare de Baghdad district covering an area between Jamiliyeh and Aziziyeh districts. It is bordered by "Majd Al-Deen Al-Jabiri" street from the east, "Kamel Al-Ghazzi" street from the west and Saadallah Al-Jabiri Square from the south. The park is intersected by Queiq River.

It was founded in 1949 as a result of the efforts of the local community and city authorities.

The park is home to many art works of famous Syrian sculptors. The statue of emir Sayf al-Dawla is located at the main entrance while the statue of poet Khalil al-Hindawi is located near the central fountains.

In October 2006, new dancing water fountains were installed at the centre of the park.

Gallery

References

Aleppo